Adolfo Leandro Carabelli (8 September 1893 - 25 January 1947)  was a piano player, composer and bandleader (tango musical genre) in Argentina during the Golden Age of tango.

Biography
He was born on 8 September 1893.

Carabelli led his own orchestra Adolfo Carabelli y su Orquesta (sometimes referred as Adolfo Carabelli y su Orquesta Típica or Adolfo Carabelli y su Jazz Band). Among the performers in it for a short time around 1928 was Luiz Americano.  He also led for some period the renowned Orquesta Típica Victor.

Among the best-known tangos of the Carabelli tango orchestra are “Mi refugio” (1931); “Cantando”, “Felicia” (1932), “Por dónde andará” (1932), “Inspiración” (1932), “Mar adentro” (1933) and others.

He died on 25 January 1947.

References 

Argentine tango musicians
1893 births
1947 deaths
Argentine pianists
Male pianists
Argentine composers